Keith Gordon (born February 3, 1961) is an American actor and film director.

Early life
Gordon was born in New York City, the son of Mark, an actor and stage director, and Barbara Gordon. He grew up in an atheist Jewish family. Gordon was inspired to become an actor at the age of twelve, after seeing James Earl Jones in a Broadway production of Of Mice and Men.

Career
As an actor, Gordon's first feature film role was that of class clown Doug in Jaws 2 (the 1978 sequel to the blockbuster hit Jaws). In 1979 Gordon appeared in Bob Fosse's semi-autobiographical All That Jazz as the teenage version of the film's protagonist Joe Gideon (played by Gordon's Jaws 2 co-star Roy Scheider). Gordon then appeared in two films by Brian De Palma: as a film student in Home Movies (1979) and in the 1980 erotic thriller Dressed to Kill as the son of Angie Dickinson's character. Gordon played Arnie Cunningham, the main character (who buys the titular car Christine), in the 1983 horror film Christine, directed by John Carpenter from the novel by Stephen King. In the 1985 cult film The Legend of Billie Jean Gordon played Lloyd Muldaur, the son of a District Attorney who aspires to be Attorney General. He was in the 1986 Mark Romanek film Static, and he wrote the screenplay. In the 1986 comedy movie Back to School, Gordon played Jason Melon, the son of Rodney Dangerfield's character. In most of these films, he played a nerd.  He was named number 1 in Cinematicals' Top 7 Most Convincing Nerds.  His most recent onscreen film appearance was in 2001, in the movie Delivering Milo.

Gordon left acting for directing, making his debut in 1988 with the movie The Chocolate War, about a student who rebels against the rigid hierarchies in his Catholic school. His other films include the 1992 anti-war film A Midnight Clear, about a group of American soldiers in the Ardennes just before and during the Battle of the Bulge, as well as Mother Night (adapted from the novel by Kurt Vonnegut), Waking the Dead, and the film The Singing Detective. He also directed some of the mini-series Wild Palms and appeared in the 2006 Iraq War documentary Whose War?. His directing credits for television include Homicide: Life on the Street, Gideon's Crossing, Dexter, The Bridge, House and the second and third seasons of Fargo.

Filmography

Film 
Films

Writing/producing

 Static (1985)

Acting roles

Television

Directing

Acting

Award nominations
Independent Spirit Awards
Best Screenplay - A Midnight Clear (1992)
Best First Feature - The Chocolate War (1988)

Sitges - Catalan International Film Festival
Best Film - The Singing Detective (2003)

References

External links

MovieMaker magazine interview
Senses of Cinema two-part interview
interview on Kittenpants.org

1961 births
Male actors from New York City
American male film actors
American film directors
American male television actors
American television directors
Jewish American atheists
Jewish American male actors
Living people
20th-century American male actors
21st-century American male actors